Technodon is the eighth and final studio album by Yellow Magic Orchestra and released in 1993, a decade after the band's original breakup. Because the name Yellow Magic Orchestra was owned by former record label Alfa Records, the band were forced to release the album under the name YMO (typically stylized as the "YMO" initialism crossed out by a large "X"). For the tour that followed, they were billed as Not YMO. Future releases by the band would be made under the names Human Audio Sponge and HASYMO.

At the time of recording, Haruomi Hosono and Ryuichi Sakamoto were incorporating many world music elements into their sound, which is still evident on Technodon, though slightly pared down and featuring simpler technopop arrangements. Yukihiro Takahashi mainly used drum machines for the record as opposed to a drum kit.

Track listing
All songs arranged by YMO.

Personnel
Ryuichi Sakamoto: keyboards, vocals
Yukihiro Takahashi: drums, vocals
Haruomi Hosono: bass, keyboards, vocals

Additional Credits
William S. Burroughs: Voice on "Be a Superman" & "I Tre Merli"
Ruriko Kamiya: Voice on "Be a Superman"
William Gibson: Voice on "Floating Away"
Hirofumi Tokutake: Guitar on "Floating Away"
John C. Lilly: Voice on "Dolphinicity"

References

1993 albums 
Yellow Magic Orchestra albums
Albums with cover art by Stefan Sagmeister